"Dig It" is a single by the band Skinny Puppy, taken from their 1986 album Mind: The Perpetual Intercourse. Nine Inch Nails frontman Trent Reznor once mentioned that the song influenced the first song he wrote, "Down in It". 

In 2015, Treble magazine named "Dig It" one of the ten most essential industrial songs to come out of the 80s.

Track listing

Personnel
Nivek Ogre – vocals
cEvin Key – drums, percussion, keyboards, guitar, bass guitar, synthesizers

Guests
D. Rudolph Goettel (gadgetry – 1)

Notes

Engineered by cEvin Key and Dave Ogilvie.
Sleeve photography, typography and design by Steven R. Gilmore.  The cover art itself is a Gustave Doré print from his illustrations for Dante's Inferno.  The back cover art is The Burial of Sarah, also by Gustave Doré.
 The song "Dig It" samples the Twilight Zone episode Elegy.

Video 
A video was produced for this song.  The video begins with cEvin Key in a graveyard with a child.  The scene then moves to an office where a man, while working, has a heart attack and dies.  In the graveyard Key begins filling in an open grave filled with various office supplies, while this is occurring Ogre is singing a refrain that contains the line, "execute economic slave."  The video features a curious style of letterboxing, that utilizes the extra space at the top and bottom of the screen with various distorted imagery. MuchMusic banned the video because the bars were perceived as containing subliminal messages.

References

External links 
 Dig It at Discogs
 

1986 singles
Skinny Puppy songs
Capitol Records singles
EMI Records singles
Nettwerk Records singles
1986 songs
Songs written by cEvin Key
Songs written by Nivek Ogre